
The following list contains the most notable road interchanges within the United States divided by each state, which are mainly part of the national Interstate Highway System and are all freeways intersecting with each other at a junction.

Some of the biggest ones are: Kennedy Interchange (I-64/I-65/I-71) in Louisville, Kentucky; the Marquette Interchange (I-94/I-43/I-794) and the $1.8 billion Zoo Interchange both in Milwaukee, Wisconsin; the Pregerson Interchange (I-110/I-105) in Los Angeles; and the Circle Interchange (I-90/I-94/I-290) in Chicago.

Alabama
Malfunction Junction at I-20/I-59 and I-65

Arizona

Mini Stack
The Stack
SuperRedTan Interchange

Arkansas
Big Rock Interchange, the junction of I-430 and I-630, Little Rock, Arkansas
North Terminal Interchange, the junction of I-40 and I-30, Little Rock, Arkansas 
South Terminal Interchange, the junction of I-30, I-440 and I-530, Little Rock, Arkansas

California
The first stack interchange in the world was the Four Level Interchange (renamed the Bill Keene Memorial Interchange), built in Los Angeles, California, and completed in 1949, at the junction of U.S. Route 101 and State Route 110. Since then, the California Department of Transportation (Caltrans) has built at least eight more four-level stacks throughout the state of California, as well as a larger number of three-level stack/cloverleaf hybrids (where the least-used left-turning ramp is built as a cloverleaf-like 270-degree loop).

Despite the construction of interchanges smoothing flow, 11 of the top 30 most congested stretches of highway in the U.S. are in Los Angeles.

Alemany Maze
Dosan Ahn Chang Ho Memorial Interchange
East Los Angeles Interchange
El Toro Y, at convergence of I-405 with I-5, in El Toro, California.  This was thought to be one of the most congested interchanges in the world at one time.
Four Level Interchange (1949), US 101 & SR 110 
Hollywood Split
Joe Colla Interchange
Judge Harry Pregerson Interchange, I-110 and I-105
Kellogg Interchange
MacArthur Maze
Newhall Pass interchange
Orange Crush interchange
The Fishhook, CA-1 and CA-17 in Santa Cruz
West Bakersfield Interchange
Wheeler Ridge Interchange

Colorado
Mousetrap

Connecticut
 New Haven Mixmaster (multi-level interchange between Interstate 95/Connecticut Turnpike, Interstate 91, and Route 34 in New Haven, Connecticut)
 The Stack (4-level stack interchange between Interstate 84 and Route 9 in Farmington, Connecticut)
 Waterbury Mixmaster (multi-level interchange between Interstate 84 and Route 8 in Waterbury, Connecticut)

Florida

Dolphin–Palmetto Interchange
Golden Glades Interchange
Midtown Interchange
Rainbow Interchange

Georgia
Cobb Cloverleaf
Tom Moreland Interchange (Spaghetti Junction)

Illinois
Jane Byrne Interchange, also known as the "Circle Interchange"

Iowa
The "MixMasters" or "Mixers" in the greater Des Moines area:
East MixMaster: Eastern terminus of Interstate 235, and intersection of I-35 from the north and I-80 from the east
West MixMaster: Western terminus of Interstate 235, and intersection of I-35 to the south and I-80 to the west
The “Systems Interchange” in Tiffin/Coralville:
Systems Interchange: The intersection of I-80 to the west/east and I-380 to the north/south

Kentucky

Kennedy Interchange, also known as "Spaghetti Junction"

Massachusetts
Braintree Split
Leverett Circle
South Bay Interchange

Michigan
Ford–Lodge interchange, the first full freeway-to-freeway interchange in the United States, completed in 1955

Minnesota
Can of Worms (Minnesota interchange)

Missouri

Grandview Triangle.  After its reconstruction it handles 250,000 cars per day (in 2016), and is believed to be capable of handling 400,000 per day.

Nevada
 Centennial Bowl
 Henderson Bowl
 Spaghetti Bowl (Las Vegas)

New Jersey
Newark Airport Interchange, the junction of I-95 (New Jersey Turnpike), I-78 (Newark Bay Extension), US 1/9 (US 1 and US 9), US 22, and Route 21 at the Newark Liberty International Airport

New Mexico
Big I, in New Mexico.  Its reconstruction was the largest public works project ever in New Mexico

New York

Bruckner Interchange
Can of Worms (interchange), Rochester, New York
Kew Gardens Interchange, Queens, New York City, serving nearly 600,000 vehicles daily.
Oakdale Merge

Pennsylvania
Pennsylvania Turnpike/Interstate 95 Interchange
Eisenhower Interchange
Interstate 279 Interchange
Mid-County Interchange
Mount Nittany Interchange
Throop Dunmore Interchange

Rhode Island
Meshanticut Interchange

Texas

High Five Interchange
Horseshoe Project

Virginia
Bowers Hill Interchange
Pinners Point Interchange
Springfield Interchange

Wisconsin
Hale Interchange
Marquette Interchange
Mitchell Interchange
Zoo Interchange

See also 

 Roundabout
 Bypass (road)

References